The Bolshoy Pit ( - "Great Pit") is a river in Krasnoyarsk Krai, Russia. It is a right hand tributary of the Yenisey.

The lower reaches of the Bolshoy Pit are navigable during the spring flood between May an June up to the village Bryanka,  from the river's mouth.

Course
The Bolshoy Pit has its source in the eastern slopes of the Yenisey Range, part of the western side of the Central Siberian Plateau. Its source is not far from the source of the Velmo, a tributary of the Podkamennaya Tunguska. After , it is joined by the Maly Pit. Flowing southwestwards across the taiga of the mountainous region, it cuts across the main ridge of the Yenisey Range through a deep gorge.

The confluence is located between the mouths of the Angara and Podkamennaya Tunguska. The river freezes in mid-November and stays frozen until mid-May.

The main tributaries of the Bolshoy Pit are the Chirimba, Panimba, Veduga, Lendakha and Kamenka on the right and the Gorbilok and Sukhoy Pit on the left.

See also
List of rivers of Russia

References

External links
Fishing in Russia

Rivers of Krasnoyarsk Krai